The White Knights of the Ku Klux Klan is a Ku Klux Klan organization which is active in the United States. It originated in Mississippi and Louisiana in the early 1960s under the leadership of Samuel Bowers, its first Imperial Wizard. The White Knights of Mississippi were formed in 1964 when they separated from the Original Knights after the resignation of Imperial Wizard Roy Davis. Roughly 200 members of the Original Knights of Louisiana also joined the White Knights. The White Knights were not interested in holding public demonstrations nor were they interested in letting any information about themselves get out to the masses. Similar to the United Klans of America (UKA), the White Knights of Mississippi were very secretive about their group. Within a year, their membership was up to around six thousand, and they had Klaverns in over half of the counties in Mississippi. By 1967, the number of active members had shrunk to around four hundred.

Formation
Congress launched an investigation of the KKK beginning in January 1966. John. D. Swenson, Louisiana Grand Dragon of the Original Knights of the Ku Klux Klan testified about klan activities before Congress. Swenson told Congress, the KKK in Mississippi had been dormant until it was revived by Imperial Wizard Roy Davis who used a clause in the KKK oath to reactivate the organization. Davis had been a leader and a founding member of the 1915 KKK. Following Davis's departure from the Original Knights of the Ku Klux Klan in 1964, the Original Knights suffered a three way split in their organization following allegations that klan funds had been misused. The Original Knights in Mississippi and about 200 members of the Original Knights in Louisiana broke away and formed the White Knights of the Ku Klux Klan under the leadership of Samuel Bowers; Bowers had been the Mississippi Grand Dragon of the Original Knights.

Murder of civil rights activists

The White Knights were responsible for many bombings, church burnings, beatings, and murders. In 1964, they murdered three civil rights workers: Andrew Goodman, James Chaney, and Michael Schwerner (their murder was later depicted in the 1988 film Mississippi Burning, loosely based on these events). The victims were members of the Congress of Racial Equality (CORE).

The White Knights leader Samuel Bowers had targeted Schwerner because of the civil rights worker's efforts to promote racial equality and because of his efforts to encourage Black people to register to vote during Freedom Summer.

In his first attempt to kill Schwerner, Bowers assembled 30 White Knights on the evening of Memorial Day 1964 and surrounded the Mount Zion Baptist Church while a meeting was taking place inside it. Bowers thought that Schwerner would be in attendance, but after he failed to find him when the meeting let out, the Knights started beating the Black people who were present, then they poured gasoline inside the church and set the church on fire.

At the time of the fire, Schwerner had been in Ohio working on helping the National Council of Churches find more students who were willing to participate in the Freedom Summer project. When he found out about the church burning, he decided to drive back to Mississippi. Accompanying him were 21-year-old James Chaney, a black man, and Andrew Goodman. They were heading to Longdale in Neshoba County, where the sheriff, Lawrence Rainey, and his deputy, Cecil Price, were members of the Klan, although the Klansmen never publicly announced it.

When the three activists got to Neshoba County, Price saw their car driving down the highway and pulled them over on the premise that they had possibly been involved in the burning of the Mount Zion Baptist Church. They were locked up, denied their right to make phone calls, and kept in jail, while Price worked out the details of their murder with a White Knights member, Edgar Ray Killen aka "The Preacher". Hours later, Price released them but he followed them from behind in his patrol car. The trio knew that they were being followed, and they eventually stopped their car, at which point Price ordered them into his vehicle. Two cars which were full of Klansmen pulled up, and all three activists were shot at close range. Their bodies were placed together in a hollow at a dam site on a farm which belonged to trucking company owner Olen Burrage and then they were covered with tons of dirt which was moved by a Caterpillar D4, it was most likely driven by heavy machinery operator Herman Tucker.

It was months before any indictments were made. Rainey and Price were indicted in 1965, but 18 members of the White Knights who were also involved in the crime were not indicted until 1967. Six men were convicted, including Sam Bowers and Deputy Price. Seven men were found not guilty, and one man was acquitted of all of the charges. Bowers and Wayne Roberts (who shot the gun) each received the longest prison sentences, 10 years.

Among those men who were indicted was Edgar Ray Killen, who was only saved from conviction because one of the jurors flatly refused to convict a man who she knew was a preacher. However, Killen was eventually convicted of the murders in June 2005, 40 years after the fact; at age 79 he was sentenced to serve "three 20-year terms, one term for each conviction of manslaughter in connection to the deaths of Chaney, Goodman, and Schwerner in 1964."

Current status of the White Knights
The Ku Klux Klan's activity in Mississippi, and specifically, the activity of the White Knights of the Ku Klux Klan, did not stop after the Civil Rights Movement. In 2017, six different Klan organizations were publicly identified in Mississippi, and three of them were identified as White Knights organizations.

In 1989, The White Knights of Mississippi attempted to go national by appointing professional wrestler Johnny Lee Clary, whose stage name was "Johnny Angel", to succeed the retiring Samuel Bowers as its new Imperial Wizard. Clary appeared on many talk shows, including The Oprah Winfrey Show and The Morton Downey Jr. Show, in an effort to build a new, modern image for the Ku Klux Klan. It was thought that Clary could build membership in the Klan due to his celebrity status as a professional wrestler.

Clary tried to unify the various chapters of the Klan by holding a meeting in the birthplace of the Ku Klux Klan, Pulaski, Tennessee, only to see it fall apart because of infighting which occurred when the Klan's various chapters came together. Clary's girlfriend was revealed to be an F.B.I. informant, which resulted in distrust of Clary among members of the different Klan chapters. Clary resigned from the Klan and later, he became a born-again Christian and a civil rights activist.

With the conviction of Killen in 2005, an earlier chapter in the history of the White Knights of Mississippi came to a close. Price died in 2001; Wayne Roberts is also deceased.

In art, entertainment, and media
 The film Mississippi Burning (1988) is based on the events surrounding the White Knights' murders of Chaney, Goodman, and Schwerner.

See also
 West End Synagogue
 Leonard William Armstrong
 List of Ku Klux Klan organizations
 Jonathan David Brown
 Damien Patton

References

Bibliography

Further reading
 Former KKK leader convicted of 1966 murder CNN.com, August 21, 1998.
 Alexander, Charles C. The Ku Klux Klan in the Southwest. Lexington: University of Kentucky Press, 1965.

External links
 Handbook of Texas

Ku Klux Klan organizations
Ku Klux Klan crimes in Mississippi
Organizations established in 1964
Organizations disestablished in 2005